Suture is a 1993 American thriller film directed by Scott McGehee and David Siegel and starring Dennis Haysbert and Mel Harris. It was screened in the Un Certain Regard section at the 1994 Cannes Film Festival.

Plot
After murdering his father, wealthy Vincent Towers decides to fake his own death. He plants a car bomb in an attempt to kill a nearly identical half-brother, Clay Arlington, after persuading Arlington to switch identities with him.

Arlington survives, but requires facial reconstruction and also has lost most of his memory. Dr. Renee Descartes is there during his recovery. Towers resurfaces and tries once more to eliminate him, but is killed himself. Arlington makes a decision to make his new identity a permanent one.

Cast
 Dennis Haysbert as Clay Arlington
 Mel Harris as Dr. Renee Descartes
 Sab Shimono as Dr. Max Shinoda
 Dina Merrill as Alice Jameson
 Michael Harris as Vincent Towers
 David Graf as Lt. Weismann
 Fran Ryan as Mrs. Lucerne
 John Ingle as Sidney Callahan
 Sanford Gibbons as Dr. Fuller (as Sandy Gibbons)
 Mark DeMichele as Detective Joe
 Sandra Ellis Lafferty as Nurse Stevens (as Sandra Lafferty)
 Capri Darling as Soprano
 Carol Kiernan as Ticket Agent
 Laura Groppe as Sportswoman
 Mel Coleman as Sportsman

Production
Scott McGehee and David Siegel had been working together since 1989. They had made two short films: "Birds Past" and "Speak Then Persephone" in 1989 and 1990, respectively. Afterwards, they decided to make a feature-length film and "attempted to construct a story that was generally about identity". McGehee has said that Suture was influenced by mid-1960s Japanese films and Hollywood films like North by Northwest. Specifically, they were inspired by Hiroshi Teshigahara's The Face of Another and Yoshitaro Nomura's Tokyo Bay, which utilized widescreen black and white cinematography. They also wanted to give the film an early '60s sensibility and loved the widescreen black and white films from that period: The Manchurian Candidate and Seconds. Siegel said, "It's an absolutely gripping look that's used so rarely today, and it's a look from a time period that we wanted to evoke".

McGehee and Siegel set up a limited partnership and borrowed money for the $1 million budget from family and friends. They decided to shoot Suture in Phoenix, Arizona because McGehee felt that it was "almost like an abandoned city, it's so large and overbuilt and the streets are so dead it feels empty". They liked the city's "high modernist, very spare aesthetic". After seeing an early rough cut of the film, Steven Soderbergh became fascinated with it and helped McGehee and Siegel find completion finances during post-production.

Release
Suture had its premiere at the 1993 Telluride Film Festival with screenings at the Sundance Film Festival and Toronto Festival of Festivals.  A 4K restoration was completed in 2016, and released on Blu-ray by Arrow Video in July 2016.

Awards
In 1994, Scott McGehee and David Siegel won Best Director at the Sitges - Catalan International Film Festival
In 1994, Greg Gardiner won the Excellence in Cinematography Award at the Sundance Film Festival

References

External links 
 
 
 

1993 films
1993 drama films
American mystery films
1990s English-language films
American black-and-white films
The Samuel Goldwyn Company films
American neo-noir films
Films about amnesia
Sundance Film Festival award winners
1993 independent films
1990s American films